SweetSexySavage is the debut studio album by American singer and songwriter Kehlani. The album was released on January 27, 2017, by Atlantic Records. Kehlani started work on the album shortly after the release of their mixtape You Should Be Here, with work proceeding into 2016. Kehlani described the album as having three elements; Sweet, Sexy and Savage, which are intended to be reflected in the album's lyrical content and production.

Kehlani was the lead writer on all tracks aside from "Intro", which was written by Reyna Biddy. Production on the project was handled by Pop & Oak, Jahaan Sweet, Charlie Heat, among others, who worked to incorporate a variety of different sounds on the album.

The album received mainly positive reviews from critics, generating a Metacritic score of 76, which ranks as Kehlani's third-highest score after their mixtape You Should Be Here from 2015, and before their mixtape While We Wait from 2019. It debuted at number three on the US Billboard 200, moving 58,000 album-equivalent units in its first tracking week. To promote the album, Kehlani embarked on the SweetSexySavage Tour.

Background and production 
After wrapping up the North American leg of the You Should Be Here Tour, new recording sessions for the album started in Philadelphia around Halloween 2015. The album was announced to be arriving "soon" in mid 2016 by Kehlani on Twitter. Work continued into 2016 where Kehlani finished and since has passed it onto their label.

The bulk of the album's production was handled by Pop & Oak, with Kehlani also working with many others, including their musical director and producer Jahaan Sweet, who they worked with on their mixtapes.

The album was inspired by TLC's album, CrazySexyCool. Kehlani also cited Natasha Bedingfield, Colbie Caillat, Gwen Stefani, and Pink as the biggest inspirations for the album. They stated that it was "more fun and aggressive" than their earlier work.

Singles 
"Crzy" was released as the lead single from SweetSexySavage on July 15, 2016, and peaked at number eighty-five on the US Billboard Hot 100. Kehlani performed the single on Jimmy Kimmel Live! to promote the album's release.

The second single, "Distraction", was released on July 23, 2016, and also peaked at number eighty-five on the Hot 100. The song impacted rhythmic radios in mid-January and has peaked in the top 40 of the rhythmic radio charts. Its accompanying music video received over 2 million views in one day on YouTube.

"Gangsta", which is featured in the DC film Suicide Squad was released on August 1, 2016, as the album's third single. The fourth single, "Keep On", was released on January 27, 2017.

Promotional singles 
The first promotional single from the album, "Advice", was premiered on Zane Lowe's Beats 1 show on December 1, 2016. Kehlani premiered the album's second promotional single "Undercover" on January 5, 2017, during Zane Lowe's Beats 1 show. "Do U Dirty" was released on January 12, 2017, as the album's third promotional single.

Release and promotion 
Kehlani promoted the album using the initials 'SSS' before finally announcing the album's title on November 27, 2016, via Twitter.

Kehlani revealed the album's cover on November 30, 2016. The album was made available to pre-order on iTunes on December 1, 2016, along with the promotional single "Advice". SweetSexySavage has 19 tracks on the deluxe version.

On January 27, Kehlani promoted the album's release by performing "Crzy" on Jimmy Kimmel Live!.

Tour 

Kehlani announced that they would be going on a world tour in support of the album on December 2, 2016. Tickets went on sale on December 14, 2016, with concert dates in North America and Europe. The tour began on February 21, 2017, in Montreal, Quebec at Club Soda, and is scheduled to conclude on November 19, 2017, in Mexico City, Mexico at the Corona Capital Festival. A portion of the European leg was cancelled due to Kehlani having surgery on their stomach. The tour visited cities across North America, Europe, Oceania and Asia.

Critical reception 

At Metacritic, which assigns a weighted average score out of 100 to reviews from mainstream critics, the album received an average score of 76 out of 100 based on 17 reviews, indicating "generally favorable reviews".

Shahzaib Hussain of Clash gave the album a 7 out of 10 and said, "The production can at times become repetitive, yet it's Kehlani's versatility as a songstress that elevates the more cookie cutter numbers." Nick Levine of NME gave the album 4 stars out of 5 and commented that "the album is cohesive without feeling too samey."

Ryan B. Patrick of Exclaim! gave the album an 8 out of 10 and said, "by getting intensely personal, Kehlani adds a human side to the recordings that's multilayered and unapologetically self-determined." Andy Kellman of AllMusic gave the album 4.5 stars out of 5, commenting that "The lows and highs, grief and pleasure, and insecurity and pride are all put on vivid display, and Kehlani pours [themself] into all of it without overselling a thought."

Katherine St. Asaph of Pitchfork gave the album a 7.0 out of 10 and stated that "Refreshingly, SweetSexySavage is at its best when it's most exuberant, giddy in the face of haters and common sense alike." Barry Walters of Entertainment Weekly gave the album a grade of B, saying, "haunting highlights like 'Piece of Mind' and 'Everything Is Yours' prove that beneath SSSs padding, there's a succinct, sassy, and sincere album waiting to be slimmed down to Kehlani's own soul-searching essence."

Accolades

Commercial performance
SweetSexySavage debuted at number three on the US Billboard 200, moving 58,000 album-equivalent units with traditional album sales of 32,000 copies in its first week. This became Kehlani's first US top-ten debut on the chart. On June 29, 2018, the album was certified gold by the Recording Industry Association of America (RIAA) for combined sales and album-equivalent units of over 500,000 units in the United States.

Track listing 

Notes
 "Piece of Mind" features vocals from Little Simz.
  signifies an additional producer
  signifies a co-producer
  signifies a vocal producer

Sample credits
 "Undercover" contains an interpolation of "Don't Matter", as performed by Akon.
 "Personal" contains a vocal sample from "Come Over", as performed by Aaliyah and Tank.
 "Not Used to It" contains an interpolation of  "Waiting" by Rhian Sheehan featuring Lotus Harley.
 "Too Much" contains an interpolation of "More Than a Woman", as performed by Aaliyah.
 "In My Feelings" contains a sample of "If It Isn't Love", as performed by New Edition

Charts

Weekly charts

Year-end charts

Certifications

Release history

References

External links 
 

2017 debut albums
Kehlani albums
Atlantic Records albums
Albums produced by Oak Felder